Humphrey Davy Findley Kitto, FBA (6 February 1897 – 21 January 1982) was a British classical scholar of Cornish ancestry. He was born in Stroud, Gloucestershire.

He was educated at The Crypt School, Gloucester, and St. John's College, Cambridge. He wrote his doctorate in  1920 at the  University of Bristol. He became a lecturer in Greek at the University of Glasgow from 1920 to 1944. On that year, he returned to the University of Bristol where he became Professor of Greek and emeritus in 1962. He concentrated on studies of Greek tragedy, especially translations of the works of Sophocles.

His early book, "In the Mountains of Greece", describes his journeys in that country, with no more than incidental reference to antiquity.

His 1952 general treatment The Greeks covered the whole range of ancient Greek culture, and became a standard text.

After his retirement, he taught at College Year in Athens (CYA), a study abroad program for foreign students in Athens, Greece.

Works
 In the Mountains of Greece (1933)
 Greek Tragedy: A Literary Study (1939)
 Form and meaning in drama: A study of six Greek plays and of Hamlet  (1956)
 The Greeks (1951; 1952), Penguin Books A220 
 Poiesis: Structure and Thought (1966), Sather Classical Lectures 
 Sophocles: Three Tragedies: Antigone, Oedipus the King, Electra. translated into English verse by H. D. F. Kitto

References

External links
 

1897 births
1982 deaths
People from Stroud
English classical scholars
Alumni of St John's College, Cambridge
People educated at The Crypt School, Gloucester
Classical scholars of the University of Bristol
Classical scholars of the University of Glasgow
Scholars of ancient Greek literature
Translators of Ancient Greek texts
Fellows of the British Academy
20th-century translators